The Oella Formation is a Late Proterozoic or early Cambrian schist in Howard and Baltimore Counties, Maryland. It is described as "Medium-grained biotite-plagioclase-muscovite-quartz schist, locally garnetiferous, interlayered on a centimeter to decimeter scale with fine-grained biotite-plagioclase-quartz gneiss, commonly bearing muscovite but less commonly garnet."

Type locality
The type locality is along the Patapsco River at Oella, southwest Baltimore County.

See also 

 Ellicott City Granodiorite

References

Geologic formations of Maryland
Cambrian System of North America
Schist formations
Baltimore County, Maryland
Howard County, Maryland